Tantalus Labs is a Canadian Licensed Producer of legal medical cannabis under the ACMPR. Based out of British Columbia and established in 2012 by Dan Sutton, Tantalus Labs cultivates in their specialized cannabis greenhouse: SunLab. SunLab was the first purpose-built cannabis greenhouse in North America, designed to cultivate quality cannabis in a more environmentally sustainable production methodology than the status quo of indoor production.

History 
Tantalus Labs was founded by Dan Sutton and incorporated on October 29, 2012. Having seen a consultation document outlining the Marijuana for Medical Purposes Regulation (MMPR), he recognized the opportunity to rethink how cannabis was being grown in BC and engaged agricultural experts to design a more efficient methodology. The result was the planning and design of SunLab, the first purpose-built cannabis cultivation facility in North America. 

In 2012, Tantalus Labs received approval to commence development of SunLab. Construction began on May 29, 2014, in Maple Ridge British Columbia and was completed on September 8, 2016. 

On May 29, 2017, Health Canada approved the company's submission for a Medical Marijuana License allowing them to acquire materials and commence planting seed crops, making them the 45th Licensed Producer in Canada and the 10th in British Columbia.

August 17, 2018, the company announced it had received its sales license from Health Canada, allowing it to begin on-boarding patients and ship cannabis products. Their five initial strains, dubbed the "Tantalus Range", span three product categories which allude to cannabinoid content, ranging from high THC, Balanced, to high CBD, vs. the traditional classification of Indica and Sativa.

Its commitment to technology and sustainability earned Tantalus Labs the moniker “the Tesla of cannabis” by prominent Canadian angel investor Shafin Diamond.

September 12, 2018, Tantalus Labs launched Tantalus Prime, its e-commerce membership program that provides door-to-door delivery directly from SunLab to registered customers. The five inaugural strains includes Blue Dream, Serratus, Skunk Haze, Harlequin, and Cannatonic.

SunLab 
Tantalus Labs keystone facility, SunLab, is a 75,000 sq. ft. purpose-built greenhouse facility for medical cannabis located in Metro Vancouver, the first of its kind in North America. It was designed to reduce the environmental impact of cannabis cultivation, which largely and historically relies on artificial light to provide the inputs for photosynthesis. SunLab uses natural full-spectrum sunlight as its main light source, reducing electricity requirements by up to 90% compared to traditional indoor growing.

The facility's roofing doubles as a rainwater catchment surface, collecting millions of litres of water annually, reducing the need of groundwater for irrigation. The rainwater is stored and passed through three stages of filtration for irrigation use throughout the year. As well, irrigation runoff itself is recaptured and recycled within the facility. 

Tantalus Labs received the first Water License issued to a cannabis company in British Columbia under the Water Sustainability Act. The company further reduced its well water needs by relying heavily on rainwater recapture.

SunLab Nano 

With Canadian cannabis legalization legislation allowing for home-growing of up to four plants, Tantalus Labs released a guidebook that aimed to encourage sustainability through a sungrown approach similar to their commercial-scale facility. The 11-page guidebook was made available free to download on Sept 26, 2017.

Awards 
Selected “Most Promising Licensed Producer” at the Canadian Cannabis Awards in 2017.

Controversies 
On May 22, 2015, prior to receiving their Medical Marijuana License, 150 residents of Maple Ridge protested the development of SunLab stating concerns around well water depletion and proximity to residential neighbourhoods. In response, Tantalus Labs licensed their well access with the BC Ministry of Forestry and committed to rainwater as its primary water source for irrigation.

Environmental issues 
Executive Dan Sutton has identified the carbon footprint associated with modern indoor growing techniques that rivals heavy industrial manufacturing.

Tantalus Labs also dedicated four acres of their 15 acre property to a land conservancy. Over 2200 individual plants, shrubs, and trees native to the region were planted in a restoration surrounding a salmon-bearing tributary stream which feeds into the Fraser River.

Political advocacy 

Tantalus Labs and Hanway Associates produced and shared a policy guidance document with 19 BC Ministries and representatives on September 18th, 2017. This document provided context and recommendations around the legal age of consumption, Retail Licensing, Supply Chain Management, Transparency and Reporting, and Ancillary Industries. Receiving no response, Tantalus Labs published this document so that the citizens of British Columbia can hold elected officials to their obligation to foster the cannabis industry and its impactful cultural history. This was the second policy guidance document produced in collaboration with Hanway Associates.

On April 10, 2017, the first collaborative whitepaper titled “Into the Light” was published to outline the state of the market, greenhouse advantages, and guidance on policy. This document highlighted greenhouse cannabis cultivation offering an environmentally friendly, economical, and secure means of production. Meant to call out and, to reverse the trend of Canadian cannabis cultivation largely being produced in Ontario in facilities relying on bunker grow op methodologies.

References 

Cannabis in British Columbia
Companies based in British Columbia